X Factor is an Italian television music competition to find new singing talent; the winner receives a € 300,000 recording contract with Sony Music.
The fifth season started on Sky Uno on 20 October 2011 and ended on 5 January 2012. It was the first season to be broadcast on a digital satellite television platform, after four seasons televised on state owned channel Rai 2. For the first time, the final was also broadcast in 3D.

The show was presented by Alessandro Cattelan, with spin-off Xtra Factor hosted by Max Novaresi and Brenda Lodigiani.
Elio was the only judge from the previous season to return. Mara Maionchi, Anna Tatangelo and Enrico Ruggeri was replaced by new judge Arisa and original judges Simona Ventura and Morgan. The winner was Francesca Michielin, mentored by Ventura, and her debut single "Distratto" was released as a digital EP the day after the final, together with the ones by the remaining Top 6 contestants.

The competition was split into several stages: auditions, bootcamp, judges' houses and live shows. The first auditions took place in Milan on 5 July 2011. On 12 September 2011, contestants performed for the first time in front of an audience, at the Teatro della Luna in Milan. After the auditions, 113 acts were admitted to the bootcamp, and only 24 of them make it to the judge's house.
Following bootcamp, successful contestants were split into four categories: Boys (male soloists aged 16 to 24), Girls (female soloists aged 16 to 24), Over 24s (soloists aged 25 and over) and Vocal Groups. Each judge mentored six acts through judges' houses, and eliminated three of them before the first live show. The live shows started on 17 November 2011. The final took place on 5 January 2012 and it was watched by 1,048,358 people, making it the highest rated show to be broadcast by Sky Uno.

Judges
The fifth edition maintained the new formula with four judges return to the jury Simona Ventura and Morgan, were confirmed Elio and newcomer Arisa. Just as in the previous edition, at time of disposal, if there were to be a tie, will be used to tilt or to a televoting period of 200 seconds that will decide the eliminated.

Judges Houses
Before proceeding with the final stage of selection, each judge would be assigned one of the four categories.
Each judge, with his or her vocal coach, would have to choose three singers who would complete the live shows of the fifth edition of X Factor.

The twelve eliminated acts were:
Boys: Steven Patrick Piu, Daniel Adomako, Jeremy Fiumefreddo
Girls: Nadia Burzotta, Paola Marotta, Alessia De Vito
25+: Michele Leonardo Cavada, Tania Furia, Paolo Bernardini
Groups: Mescla, 2080, I Malviventi

Contestants and categories
Key:
 – Winner
 – Runner-up
 – Third Place

Live shows

Results summary
The number of votes received by each act was released by Sky Italia after the final.

Colour key

Notes
  During week 5, after the first round, the public was asked to vote the act to be eliminated, and not the act to be saved, amongst the three contestants who received fewer votes.

Live show details

Week 1 (17 November 2011)
Celebrity performers: Kasabian ("Days Are Forgotten")
Other guests: Miguel Bosé
Group performance: "Pride (In the Name of Love)"

Judge's vote to eliminate
 Arisa: Le 5 – backed his own act, Rahma Hafsi.
 Elio: Rahma Hafsi – backed his own act, Le 5.
 Morgan: Rahma Hafsi – based on the final showdown performance.
 Ventura: Rahma Hafsi – wanted to support Le 5's musical projects.

Week 2 (24 November 2011)
Celebrity performers: James Morrison ("I Won't Let You Go")
Other guests: Francesco Mandelli and Fabrizio Biggio (I soliti idioti)

Judge's vote to eliminate
 Elio: Valerio De Rosa – backed his own act, Le 5.
 Morgan: Le 5 – backed his own act, Valerio De Rosa.
 Ventura: Le 5 – felt that Le 5 still needed to find their right musical direction.
 Arisa: Valerio De Rosa – could not decide so chose to take it to deadlock.

With both acts receiving two votes each, the result went to deadlock and a new public vote commenced for 200 seconds. Le 5 were eliminated as the act with the fewest public votes.

Week 3 (1 December 2011)
Theme: Disco Party
Celebrity performers: Giorgia ("È l'amore che conta")
Group performance: Hung Up

Judges' votes to eliminate
 Morgan: Valerio De Rosa – gave no reason but stated that he hoped for a deadlock.
 Ventura: Davide Papasidero – to balance Morgan's vote, hoping for a deadlock.
 Arisa: Davide Papasidero – stated that she preferred De Rosa.
 Elio: Davide Papasidero – based on the final showdown performances.

Week 4 (8 December 2011)
Celebrity performers: Daniele Silvestri ("Questo Paese" and "Il flamenco della doccia" with Elio), Morgan with Davide Papasidero ("Life on Mars?")

Judges' votes to eliminate
 Elio: Cafè Margot – felt he could be more helpful for I Moderni.
 Arisa: Cafè Margot – based on the final showdown performances.
 Morgan: I Moderni – felt that Cafè Margot's performance was "too redundant", but that they had potential to improve with their mentor's help.
 Ventura: Cafè Margot – thinking that I Moderni were more interesting for the recording industry.

Week 5 (15 December 2011)
Celebrity performers: Subsonica ("Up Patriots to Arms"), Raphael Gualazzi ("Zuccherino dolce")

Judges' votes to eliminate
 Morgan: Claudio Cera – backed his own act, Vincenzo Di Bella.
 Arisa: Vincenzo Di Bella – backed her own act, Claudio Cera.
 Ventura: Claudio Cera – felt that Cera was ready for the music business outside of the show.
 Elio: Claudio Cera – felt that Cera was not focused on a particular style.

Week 6: Quarter-final (22 December 2011)
Theme: Songs from films (Round 1), Free choice (Round 2)
Celebrity performers: Marco Mengoni ("Tanto il resto cambia")
Group performance: "Do They Know It's Christmas?"

Judges' vote to eliminate
 Ventura: Vincenzo Di Bella – backed her own act, Jessica Mazzoli.
 Morgan: Jessica Mazzoli – backed his own act, Vincenzo Di Bella.
 Arisa: Vincenzo Di Bella – stated that she preferred Mazzoli.
 Elio: Vincenzo Di Bella – took his previous comments on the two acts into consideration.

Week 7: Semi-final (29 December 2011)
Theme: Previously unreleased songs (Round 1), Free choice (Round 2)
Celebrity performers: Antonello Venditti ("Unica"), Morgan ("Lontano lontano")

Judges' votes to eliminate
 Ventura: Jessica Mazzoli - gave no reason but said she hoped for a deadlock.
 Morgan: Nicole Tuzii - gave no reason.
 Arisa: Nicole Tuzii - gave no reason.
 Elio: Jessica Mazzoli - could not decide so chose to take it to deadlock.

With both acts receiving two votes each, the result went to deadlock and a new public vote commenced for 200 seconds. Jessica Mazzoli was eliminated as the act with the fewest public votes.

Week 8: Final (5 January 2012)
Theme: Celebrity duets (Round 1, part 1), previously unreleased songs (Round 1, part 2), Medley of the best performances on X Factor
Celebrity performers: Fiorella Mannoia ("Io non ho paura"), Morgan & Asia Argento ("The Indifferences"), Arisa, Elio, Morgan & Simona Ventura ("Spirit in the Sky")

Notes

External links
 X Factor Italia

2011 Italian television seasons
Italian music television series
Italy 05
X Factor (Italian TV series)
2012 Italian television seasons